Câu lạc bộ bóng đá Tiền Giang, simply known as Tiền Giang, is a Vietnamese football club based in Mỹ Tho, Tiền Giang Province, Vietnam. They are now playing in V.League 3.
 
The team is currently playing at Tiền Giang Stadium.

Honours

National competitions
League
V.League 2:
 Runners-up :  2005

Current squad

'As April 2019''

References 

Football clubs in Vietnam
1976 establishments in Vietnam